Brohi may be:
 an alternative spelling of Brahui
 Brohi Charan, a community in Pakistan

As a surname 
 A. K. Brohi, Pakistani politician
 Haleem Brohi, Pakistani author and journalist
 Imran Brohi, Pakistani cricketer
 Khalida Brohi, Pakistani activist